The Fryeburg Fair is a large agricultural fair held annually in Fryeburg in the U.S. state of Maine. The fair was first held in March 1851, and in subsequent years has grown to become the state's largest agricultural fair. The Fryeburg Fair features livestock shows, harness racing, horse pulling, antique farm and forestry equipment displays and demonstrations, horticultural and culinary contests and displays, a petting zoo, agricultural vendor displays, live musical acts, amusement rides, and food stands. The fair, held over an eight-day period in early October, attracted over 166,000 paid attendees in 2013.

No fair was held in 1917–18, 1942–44 nor 2020.

References

External links

 The Official Fryeburg Fair Website
 Town of Fryeburg Official Website

Annual fairs
Fairs in the United States
Tourist attractions in Oxford County, Maine
Fryeburg, Maine
Recurring events established in 1851
Festivals in Maine
1851 establishments in Maine